Floating Features is the third studio album by American band La Luz. It was released on May 11, 2018 under Hardly Art.

Critical reception
Floating Features was met with "generally favorable" reviews from critics. At Metacritic, which assigns a weighted average rating out of 100 to reviews from mainstream publications, this release received an average score of 75, based on 9 reviews. Aggregator Album of the Year gave the release a 77 out of 100 based on a critical consensus of 10 reviews.

Accolades

Track listing

Charts

Personnel

Musicians
 Shana Cleveland – lead vocals, guitar
 Alice Sandahl – keyboard
 Lena Simon – bass
 Marian Li Pino – drums, backing vocals

Production
 Dan Auerbach – producer
 M. Allen Parker – mixing
 Richard Dodd – mastering
 Vikesh Kapoor – cover photo
 Lauren Cordon – cover art

References

2018 albums
La Luz (band) albums
Hardly Art albums